Shadowhunters, also known as Shadowhunters: The Mortal Instruments, is an American supernatural drama television series developed by Ed Decter, based on the book series The Mortal Instruments written by Cassandra Clare. It premiered in North America on Freeform on January 12, 2016. Primarily filmed in Toronto, Ontario, Canada, the series follows Clary Fray (Katherine McNamara), who finds out on her eighteenth birthday that she is not who she thinks she is, but rather comes from a long line of Shadowhunters, human-angel hybrids who hunt down demons, and has to deal with the struggle of forbidden love.

It is the second adaptation of the novel series, after the 2013 film The Mortal Instruments: City of Bones, which, like the series, was produced by Constantin Film, and serves as a reboot. The debut season of Shadowhunters received mixed responses from critics. The pilot episode attracted the largest audience for Freeform in more than two years. The show received numerous award nominations, winning one GLAAD Award, six Teen Choice Awards and five People's Choice Awards.

In March 2016, the series was renewed for a second season of 20 episodes, which premiered on January 2, 2017. In August 2016, showrunner Ed Decter left the series over "creative differences". Todd Slavkin and Darren Swimmer were named as Decter's replacements. In April 2017, Freeform renewed the show for a third season of 20 episodes, which premiered on March 20, 2018. In June 2018, Freeform canceled the series after three seasons, but ordered two extra episodes to properly conclude the series' story; the second half of the third season premiered on February 25, 2019, with 12 episodes ordered. The two-part series finale aired on May 6, 2019.

Plot
On her 18th birthday, Clary Fray is accepted into the Brooklyn Academy of Arts. That evening, while out celebrating with her best friend, Simon Lewis, Clary sees a group of suspicious people that nobody else can see. She follows them into the back room of the club, witnessing a fight. She interferes, grabbing a blade. Believing she has accidentally committed a murder, Clary is distraught and immediately rushes home. Her mother, Jocelyn Fray, then reveals invisible inkings on her own skin, similar to those worn by the group at the club. Knowing she will be attacked, Jocelyn fears for Clary's safety, asking their friend Dot to send her through a portal to Luke, her only father figure.

However, when she arrives, Clary believes Luke has betrayed her, leading to her returning to her apartment. When she arrives, she finds her mother missing, and a monstrous Dot asking her about a Mortal Cup. Clary is saved by a blond boy from the club, who seems to know more about herself than she does. She joins up with a group of Shadowhunters, half angel half human, to save her mother from the villainous Valentine Morgenstern, Clary's own father, and discovers powers she never knew she possessed. Clary is thrown into the world of demon hunting with the mysterious, narcissistic, and attractive Shadowhunters Jace, Isabelle and Alec and drags her loyal and geeky friend Simon along for the ride. Now living amongst the fair folk, warlocks, vampires, and werewolves, Clary begins a journey of self-discovery as she learns more about her past and what her future may hold.

Cast and characters

Main
 Katherine McNamara as Clary Fairchild, a shadowhunter raised among mundanes (humans) who finds out her true heritage on her 18th birthday. She is the daughter of Jocelyn Fairchild and Valentine Morgenstern. She spends most of the first season trying to find her mother, who was kidnapped and held captive by Valentine, before finally reuniting with her, only to be separated from her for good after she is killed in the second season by a demon that infiltrated the Institute. Later in the second season, Clary kills Valentine, leading her to become a skilled shadowhunter in the third season. She deals with the reappearance of her long-lost and previously assumed dead brother Jonathan, who was resurrected by the Queen of Hell, Lilith. She later falls under Jonathan's influence because of a mark Lilith carved on her skin that binds her life with Jonathan's, which is removed by Jace with a heavenly fire sword named Glorious. In the third-season finale, Clary kills Jonathan through the creation of a rune, something that costs her powers, runes and memories of the Shadow World. She returns to resume her mundane passion of being an artist and runs into Jace during an art exposition where despite his glamour, she somehow sees and recognizes him.
 Dominic Sherwood as Jace Herondale, a charming and narcissistic playboy shadowhunter who falls in love with Clary and is the adoptive brother of Alec, Isabelle and Max Lightwood. Jace and Alec are also Parabatai. He was thought to be Michael Wayland's son and Clary's brother; however, in the second season, he is revealed to be a Herondalea respected and royal-like family line. At the end of the second season, he is killed by Valentine and subsequently resurrected by a mourning Clary as a wish to the Angel Raziel. In the third season, his mental health and vulnerability to demonic influence are the pivotal storyline and consequences of his resurrection. He also does whatever it takes to remover the rune Lilith carved on Clary's skin, finally doing so with the Glorious sword. In the series finale, Jace, unable to move on from Clary, who had to sacrifice her powers and memories of the Shadow World to kill her brother Jonathan, visits her at an art exposition where, despite being glamoured, is somehow seen by her.
 Alberto Rosende as Simon Lewis, Clary's childhood best friend who gets involved in the Shadow World and later becomes a vampire. In the second season, he becomes a Daylighter (a vampire able to walk into the sun without getting burned) after drinking from Jace's angel blood and starts dating Clary before breaking up with her because of her feelings for Jace which are revealed by the Seelie Queen and dates Maia instead, with whom he immediately bonds despite their species being mortal enemies of each other. In the third season, he is granted a powerful mark by the Seelie Queen, which has the power to banish Greater Demons and uses to send Lilith back to Edom. Simon is also disowned by his mother when Heidi, his vampire stalker, reveals his vampirism by manipulating him into feeding on his sister, who supports him nevertheless, but has his mother's memories of him as a vampire erased, making her believe that he is dead. Later, Simon and Maia break up in order for the latter to become the new alpha of the werewolf pack. He later develops feelings for Isabelle and they start dating in the series finale.
 Matthew Daddario as Alec Lightwood, a serious and no-nonsense shadowhunter, the older brother of Isabelle and Max and the adoptive brother and Parabatai of Jace. He falls in love with Magnus and starts dating him in the second season after coming out as gay at his arranged wedding in the first season. In the second season, Alec becomes the Head of the New York Institute and is on good terms with Clary, whom he initially distrusted, after being possessed by a demon that killed her mother Jocelyn. In the series finale, he marries Magnus and becomes the new Inquisitor of the Clave.
 Emeraude Toubia as Isabelle Lightwood, a seductive and charismatic shadowhunter who is the younger sister of Alec, the older sister of Max and the adoptive sister of Jace. In the second season, she becomes addicted to a vampire drug known as yin fen but later overcomes the addiction with the help of Raphaela vampire friend of hers. In the third season, she becomes the new weapons master of the New York Institute. At the end of the third season, she starts dating Simon while taking over her brother's role as the current Head of the New York Institute.
 Isaiah Mustafa as Luke Garroway, a former shadowhunter turned werewolf and NYPD cop, Valentine's former parabatai, and a father figure to Clary and boyfriend to Jocelyn prior to her death. In the first season, he becomes the new alpha of the werewolf pack after killing the previous one who threatened to do the same with Clary and Simon if they did not reveal the Mortal Cup's whereabouts. In the second season, following Alaric's death at the hands of Valentine, Luke is partnered with a mundane named Ollie who is suspicious of his actions and eventually finds out he is a werewolf. In the third season, Luke is fired from the NYPD after refusing to cooperate in the case of Ollie's sudden disappearance and matricide, not wanting to endanger anyone else with the existence of the Shadow World and steps down as alpha since he still cares about Clary, especially after most of his followers justifiably questioned his leadership. Later, he passes the title to Maia and starts dating Maryse, his former Circle colleague, before injecting himself with the remaining Heavenly Fire vial left, becoming a Shadowhunter again.
 Harry Shum Jr. as Magnus Bane, a very powerful, intelligent and wise warlock who is the former High Warlock of Brooklyn. He falls in love with Alec at first sight, and in the second season, they start dating. In the third season, he is stripped of his High Warlock title following his decision to align himself and the other warlocks with the Seelie Queen after finding out that Valentine still possessed the Soul-Sword, a sword that is capable of killing demon-blooded creatures and compelling the truth out of a person. This causes him to question the Clave's trustworthiness since the Clave concealed this information from him. In the third season, Magnus gives up his powers to his father Asmodeus in exchange for saving Jace from Lilith. Later, he tries to adjust to his new status as a mundane with Alec's help. Magnus later gets his powers back from Asmodeous, marries Alec, and becomes the High Warlock of Alicante in the series finale.
 Alisha Wainwright as Maia Roberts (season 3; recurring season 2), a mundane turned werewolf, a member of Luke's pack, and the bartender at the Hunter's Moon.  She is struggling with trust issues because of her history with her ex, who is the cause of her lycanthropy. In the second season, she and Jace initially clash after she and the other werewolves wrongly accuse him of murdering Gretel, one of their own and Maia's friend, which was Valentine's doing and Jace only assisted in kidnapping her. They later sleep together. She later meets Simon and, despite them being werewolf and vampire, they immediately start bonding with each other. In the second season, she starts dating Simon, despite some reluctance because of her past. In the third season, Maia and Simon break up, allowing Maia to become the new pack's alpha.

Recurring

Introduced in season one
 Alan van Sprang as Valentine Morgenstern (seasons 1–2; guest season 3), a rogue shadowhunter and the leader of the Circle who is Clary and Jonathan's father and Jocelyn's ex-husband. In the first season, Valentine tricks Clary and Jace into believing they are siblings and successfully blackmails the latter into joining him by threatening his friends' lives. In the second season, Valentine breaks into the Institute and activates the Soul-Sword, murdering a majority of the Downworlders. He also reveals his deception to Jace when the Soul-Sword forces him to tell the truth and is put into the Clave's custody. However, he is broken out of his cell by Jonathan who joins him on his quest to obtain the Mortal Instruments and raise the Angel Raziel to wish for the destruction of all Downworlders. In the second-season finale, he kills Jace and is then himself killed by a vengeful Clary (who then resurrects Jace) before he could make the wish. In the third season, he is briefly resurrected by Clary through a Necromancy rune in order to question him about Lilith before killing him again by deactivating the rune from his chest after going on a murderous rampage at the Gard.
 Maxim Roy as Jocelyn Fairchild (seasons 1–2; guest season 3), Clary's warm and protective mother and Valentine's ex-wife, who is a former member of the Circle. She raised Clary as a mundane after having Magnus erase her memories. In the first season, she is kidnapped by Valentine's men and subsequently rescued and released by Clary and the others. In the second season, her loyalty is questioned by the Clave and they reassign her to Idris. She is later killed by a demon that infiltrated the New York Institute and possessed a guilt-ridden Alec before she can move to Idris. In the third season, Jocelyn appears as a spirit to Clary, warning her not to create more runes or she would be stripped of her shadowhunter powers.
 Vanessa Matsui as Dorothea Rollins (seasons 1–2), a younger warlock who is Jocelyn's assistant at the shop Jocelyn owns and a sister figure to Clary. In the first season, she is kidnapped and seemingly killed by Valentine as Magnus stated that he couldn't feel her magic anymore, but is revealed to be still alive in the second season as she was kept by Valentine for her magic but became a subject to injections that influenced her to serve him. Dot eventually betrays Valentine and rejoins the group. After Jonathan, Clary's brother, reappears to take the Mortal Mirror, Dot gives Clary and Jace a chance to escape while she faces him. However, Dot isn't seen or heard of again after that. The newly resurrected Jonathan doesn't even confirm in the third season whether he killed her or not.
 Jon Cor as Hodge Starkweather (season 1; guest season 2), a former Circle member and the weapons trainer at the New York Institute. In the first-season finale, he gives up the Mortal Cup from Valentine in order to rid himself from a rune that burned him whenever he mentioned the evil shadowhunter and the Circle. In the second season, he was locked up at the City of Bones for his actions and killed by Valentine when he stormed in looking for the Soul-Sword. 
 David Castro as Raphael Santiago, a catholic vampire who is Camille's former right-hand man and the former leader of the Brooklyn vampire clan. In the second season, he develops a co-dependent relationship with Isabelle but later reveals to her that he is asexual and has been since before he became a vampire. In the third season, he resurrects Heidi as a vampire to find out how to become a daylighter by subjecting her to experiments. His plans are discovered by Isabelle who consequently banishes him. Later, after doing community service in Phoenix, he and Isabelle make amends before he is sent to the Clave where he is transferred to the Heavenly Fire project. After being injected with the serum, Raphael becomes human and makes a fresh start on his mundane life.
 Jade Hassouné as Meliorn, a Seelie Knight loyal to the Seelie Queen and Isabelle's ex-lover.
 Kaitlyn Leeb as Camille Belcourt (season 1; guest season 2), the former leader of the Brooklyn vampire clan and Magnus' ex-girlfriend. In the first season, she is overthrown by Raphael for breaking the Accords by turning Simon, a mundane, into a vampire. In the second season, she is on the run from the Clave due to being responsible for some vampire bleeder dens. She is summoned with a box containing her grave dirt by Magnus who then sends her to the Clave.
 Christina Cox as Elaine Lewis, Simon and Rebecca's widowed mother. In the third season, she eventually finds out that Simon is a vampire and disowns him after Heidi manipulates him into feeding on his sister, but Simon nevertheless erases her memories, making her believe that he is dead. It is later revealed that she and Becky moved to Florida sometime after the incident and managed to move on from the traumatic experience.
 Nicola Correia-Damude as Maryse Lightwood, the former head of the New York Institute and former member of the Circle who is Alec, Isabelle and Max's mother, Jace's adoptive mother and Robert's ex-wife. She later develops a friendship with Magnus and starts dating Luke. In the third season, she is stripped of her runes and becomes a mundane after the Clave, following an investigation on former Circle members due to Consul Malachi's attempted coup, deems her a traitor for her past actions while working for Valentine. She later attends Magnus and Alec's wedding.
 Paulino Nunes as Robert Lightwood (seasons 1–2; guest season 3), a former member of the Circle who is Maryse's ex-husband, Alec, Isabelle and Max's father and Jace's adoptive father. He is married to Maryse at the start of the first season but divorce due to his infidelity. In the third season, Maryse reveals that, while the Clave deemed her a traitor, Robert was reassigned to the Los Angeles Institute, taking their young son, Max, with him. In the finale, he reappears when he and Max are confronted by Jonathan, who started targeting institutes around the world and had left a lot of casualties on his wake. After Jonathan is killed by Clary, he and Max attend Magnus and Alec's wedding.
 Jack Fulton as Max Lightwood (seasons 1–2; guest season 3), Alec and Isabelle's precocious younger brother and Jace's adoptive brother who is eager to become a shadowhunter. 
 Holly Deveaux as Rebecca Lewis (seasons 2–3; guest season 1), Simon's older sister. In the third season, she finds out that Simon is a vampire after Heidi manipulated him into feeding on her, leaving her hospitalized. However, she doesn't Turn and supports Simon. Later, she and their mother both move to Florida for a fresh start and visits Simon on Halloween to spend time with him. She also encourages Simon into making a move on Isabelle after deducing that he is in love with her.
 Stephanie Bennett as Lydia Branwell (seasons 1–2), a member of the Clave who temporarily takes over the New York Institute and is engaged to Alec but does not marry him when he comes out as gay at their wedding. She is later replaced by Victor Aldertree as the new head after Valentine retrieves the Mortal Cup and Jace joins his cause. Lydia was meant to return in the third season but this never came to fruition since Bennett was not available.
 Raymond Ablack as Raj (seasons 1–2; guest season 3), a shadowhunter who often enforces the orders of the head of the New York Institute, regardless of who is chosen for the title. In the third season, he and other shadowhunters are banished to Wrangel Island for challenging Alec's authority as the current head.
 Mimi Kuzyk as Imogen Herondale (seasons 2–3; guest season 1), the former Inquisitor of the Clave who is Jace's biological long-lost grandmother. In the third season, she is killed by Jace being possessed by an owl demon under Lilith's influence while managing to assist Clary, Alec and Isabelle in stealing the Malachi Configuration in order to contain Jace and prevent the Clave from capturing him. In the third-season finale, Alec takes her place as the new Inquisitor.
 Joel Labelle as Alaric Rodriguez (seasons 1–2), a werewolf who is Luke's NYPD partner. In the second season, he is killed by Valentine after activating the Soul-Sword that claimed the lives of most of the Downworlders who stormed into the Institute.
 Jordan Hudyma as Blackwell (season 1)
 Shailene Garnett as Maureen Brown (season 1), Clary and Simon's friend and Simon's bandmate who happens to have a crush on the latter, which Clary herself is aware of. Due to Simon's active absence from his mundane activities, she cuts all ties with him and drops out of his band.
 Stephen R. Hart as Brother Jeremiah (seasons 1–2), one of the Silent Brothers who is killed by Valentine in the second season at the time of Jace's arrest for high treason.

Introduced in season two
 Nick Sagar as Victor Aldertree (season 2; guest season 3), a Clave diplomat who takes over the Institute and leads the manhunt on Jace. In the second season, he was sent back to Idris to face reprimand for his actions and replaced by Alec. In the third season, he creates a heavenly fire serum to turn Downworlders into mundanes against their own will and is arrested by the Clave when his plans are exposed. He is responsible for Isabelle's addiction to yin fen after encouraging her to take it following her injury.
 Lisa Berry as Sister Cleophas Garroway (season 2; guest season 3), a former member of the Circle, Iron Sister and Luke's younger sister who is still secretly working for Valentine. In the third season, Cleophas, now living in a barn, helps Clary make contact with the Angel Ithuriel for information about Lilith.
 Luke Gallo as Rufus (season 2; guest season 3)
 Will Tudor as Sebastian Verlac (season 2) / Jonathan Morgenstern, Clary's older brother and the firstborn son of Jocelyn and Valentine who was injected with demon blood before his birth. Because of Jonathan's murderous tendencies, Valentine sent him to Edom where Lilith took care of him and loved him like her own son. During the second season, Jonathan escapes Edom, steals the Soul-Sword and takes the identity of Sebastian Verlac, an English shadowhunter whom he kidnaps and later kills, to infiltrate the Institute. After his cover is blown, Jace kills Jonathan and pushes him into a river. In his final moments, Jonathan manages to call out for Lilith and summon an army of wraith demons. In the third season, Jonathan briefly appears to Jace in nightmares and illusions before being resurrected by Lilith in the mid-season finale. 
 Alexandra Ordolis as Olivia "Ollie" Wilson, a former NYPD cop, Luke's former partner and Sam's girlfriend. In the third season, she becomes aware of the existence of the Shadow World, eventually falling under Lilith's influence and killing her own mother, which prompts the NYPD to open an investigation against her, with Luke getting fired trying to get her out of trouble. After Lilith is banished to Edom and Ollie is released from her control, the Praetor Lupus relocates both her and Sam, giving them new identities to keep them safe.
 Tara Joshi as Samantha "Sam" (season 2; guest season 3), Ollie's girlfriend. She initially doesn't believe Ollie's claims about the Shadow World until she gets possessed by Lilith. After being released from Lilith's control, the Praetor Lupus relocates both Ollie and Sam, giving them new identities to keep them safe.
 Lola Flanery and Sarah Hyland (season 2) as the Seelie Queen, the ruler of the Seelie court who takes an interest in Simon's Daylighter status. In the second season, after word is spread about the Clave not having the Soul-Sword in their possession, the Queen coerces the Downworlders into joining forces to take Valentine down without affiliating themselves with the shadowhunters, offering them shelter at her court in return. However, she doesn't make good on her promise after she secretly makes a deal with Valentine, who is allowed to bypass the wards that prevented him from leaving the city for him to head to Idris and raise the Angel Raziel with the Mortal Instruments. She also kidnaps Maia to lure Simon, who earlier refused to be her accomplice, forcing him to make a deal with her to guarantee her freedom. In the third season, she grants Simon with the Mark of Cain, which he uses to send Lilith, the mother of all demons, back to Edom. Jonathan later visits her to inquire about the Morning Star sword, changing to an adult form. In the finale, after reverting to her child form, Jonathan murders the Queen after she outlives her usefulness with him.
 Alyssa Capriotti as Lindsay, a nerdy Shadowhunter.
 Stephanie Belding as Iris Rouse, a warlock who has the ability to bring people back from the dead who breeds demon babies with human women she controls. In the second season, Clary turns to her to try and resurrect her mother Jocelyn but backs out at the last minute, leading Iris to activate a blood oath she previously made, instructing Clary to find Madzie, Iris' warlock goddaughter (and the only one who can cure Clary's burning hand) who Valentine uses for his plans, before Magnus sends Iris to the Clave. In the third season, when Iris is about to be executed, she is broken out of the Gard by the briefly resurrected Valentine, attempting to get Madzie back but is recaptured in the process. She is transferred to the Heavenly Fire project (and injected with the serum), where Simon goes undercover to try and remove the rune that binds Clary's life to Jonathan's. Iris ultimately sacrifices herself to allow Simon, Raphael and Helen to escape unharmed and get the vials for Clary.
 Ariana Williams as Madzie, Iris's goddaughter who has a close bond with Alec and Magnus.
 Noah Danby as Russell, a tough member of Luke's pack. In the third season, he becomes the pack's current alpha after Luke retires before being murdered by Griffin, the new leader of the vampire clan, allowing Maia to take over the pack.
 Joanne Jansen as Gretel (season 2), another member of Luke's pack and Maia's closest friend who is murdered by Valentine
 Neven Pajkic as Taito (season 2), a member of Luke's pack and Gretel's godfather. He becomes one of the many casualties left on Valentine's wake after activating the Soul-Sword.
 Shannon Kook as Duncan (season 2), a Shadowhunter who is blackmailed by Jonathan, disguised as Sebastian, into helping him break Valentine out of custody in exchange for the release of his family. However, Jonathan does not uphold the deal and instead kills him.
 Chad Connell as Quinn (season 2), a member of Raphael's clan who accidentally kills Heidi, a frequent client of a bleeder den, by feeding on her feet. He is killed by Simon when he refuses to take responsibility.
 Erica Deutschman as Eloise (season 2), a blonde member of Raphael's clan.
 Andreas Apergis as Malachi Dieudonné (season 2), the Consul of the Clave who secretly works for Valentine. He is killed by Jace and replaced by Jia Penhallow.
 Kevin Alves as Bartholomew "Bat" Velasquez, a mundane whom Russell Turns and becomes a member of the werewolf pack.
 Sophia Walker as Catarina Loss (guest season 2; recurring season 3), a warlock who is a close friend of Magnus and becomes Madzie's guardian.
 Tessa Mossey as Heidi McKenzie (guest season 2; recurring season 3), a mundane whom Simon meets at a bleeder den who is accidentally drained of blood by Quinn, another vampire. In the third season, she is resurrected as a vampire and brutally experimented on by Raphael in his pursuit to become a daylighter like Simon, though as a consequence, she becomes a great danger to the mundane realm, killing innocent people and holding Simon's family hostage, which causes Elaine to disown Simon, thinking that he tried to kill his sister. Heidi later plays both the werewolves and vampires against each other, massacring most of the werewolf pack in the process. She is killed for good by a vengeful Maia when she attempts to get away with it.
 Josh Horvath as Joshua / ND Vampire, a member of the Brooklyn vampire clan and Raphael's bodyguard. He becomes Griffin's bodyguard upon his succession. Joshua was sent to the Clave following the attack on Maia's pack. He gets arrested alongside Griffin, Elle and other vampires after Heidi makes them take the fall for it.

Introduced in season three
 Anna Hopkins as Lilith, a Greater Demon and the ruler of Edom In the third season, she tries to kill Jace as revenge for murdering Jonathan and creates a resurrection ritual by possessing mundandes in order to bring him back, but she is foiled by Simon who sends her back to Edom with the Mark of Cain, although the ritual is completed and Jonathan comes back from the dead. In the third-season finale, she is killed by Isabelle with the Heavenly Fire embedded in her veins.
 Javier Muñoz as Lorenzo Rey, the current High Warlock of Brooklyn who happens to be jealous of Magnus. He eventually gets over it when the group convinces him to help them save both Magnus and Isabelle.
 Chai Hansen as Jordan Kyle, a mundane turned werewolf who is Maia's ex-boyfriend and is the reason why Maia became a werewolf in the first place. Ahead of the finale, Jordan dies from a silver poison injury sustained during the deadly battle at the Jade Wolf between vampires and werewolves. 
 Genevieve Kang as Morgan Young, a young woman who is briefly possessed by Lilith 
 Jonathan Ho as Brother Zachariach, a Silent Brother who has a face of his own and is later revealed to have the ability to speak when acting as the officiant of Alec and Magnus' wedding
 James McGowan as Praetor Scott, a member of the Praetor Lupus who has Luke released from prison after he falsely took credit for his pack's massacre
 Brooks Darnell as Charlie Cooper, a mundane doctor who meets and briefly dates Isabelle before the latter ends things between them since Shadowhunters do not date mundanes
 Jack J. Yang as Asmodeus, a Greater Demon and Magnus' father, who forces him to give up his powers in return for providing him with magic to release Jace from Lilith's control. He takes over Lilith's reign after she is banished to Edom with the Mark of Cain. Later on, Alec demands that the give it back to Magnus, who has been grappling with being a mundane; Asmodeus agrees but on the condition that he and Magnus end their relationship, which Alec reluctantly obliges to. After Magnus eventually finds out from Maryse, he sends Asmodeus to eternal limbo.
 Steve Byers as Andrew Underhill, an openly gay Shadowhunter who is the Institute's head of security
 Françoise Yip as Jia Penhallow, the current Consul of the Clave following Malachi's death and Aline's mother
 Conrad Coates as Detective Dwyer, the NYPD's lieutenant and Luke's boss
 Romaine Waite as Griffin, the new leader of the Brooklyn vampire clan following Raphael's banishment. He is imprisoned by the Clave alongside his subordinates for their roles in the werewolf pack massacre.
 Aimee Bessada as Elle, a member of Griffin's vampire clan who is imprisoned alongside the other vampires for their roles in the werewolf pack massacre. However, she is transferred to the Heavenly Fire project, where she is forcibly taken away to be injected, becoming a mundane herself. 
 Pasha Ebrahimi as Cain, Abel's brother and the son of Adam and Eve who became a vampire through Lilith's magic and has also the Mark of Cain
 Katie Strain as Nora Kendall, a woman who dislikes Heidi
 Luke Baines as Jonathan Morgenstern, the restored form of Clary's brother upon his resurrection. Will Tudor previously played Jonathan in the second season and briefly reprised the role in two episodes of the third season before the role was recast with Baines following the character's resurrection.
 Kimberly-Sue Murray as the adult Seelie Queen. When Jonathan visits her, he promises to kill Lilith himself in exchange for the Morning Star sword. Jonathan and Clary, under the influence of Lilith's rune, kindap the Seelie Queen, who is forced to give up the sword after her ransom is demanded. In the meantime, the Queen develops feelings for Jonathan, who later murders her after becoming more powerful than ever before.
 Kyana Teresa as Lanaia, a Seelie nymph who briefly serves Jonathan before turning on him. In her attempt to kill him on the Seelie Queen's orders, she is killed herself by Clary.
 Jacky Lai as Aline Penhallow, Sebastian's cousin and Jia's daughter. Eileen Li previously played Aline through a guest role in the second season before the role was passed to Lai due to scheduling conflicts with the former actress. 
 Sydney Meyer as Helen Blackthorn, a Shadowhunter half Seelie who starts dating Aline

Episodes

Production

Development
In 2010, Screen Gems announced that they were going into production on the film adaptation of City of Bones, the first book in The Mortal Instruments series, with hopes of starting a successful film franchise. Production on a film adaptation of the second book, City of Ashes, was due to start in September 2013, but was delayed to 2014, and eventually cancelled, after the first film failed to recoup its budget.

On October 12, 2014, at Mipcom, Constantin confirmed that The Mortal Instruments will return as a television series with Ed Decter as showrunner. Constantin Film and TV head Martin Moszkowicz told The Hollywood Reporter that, "It actually makes sense to do [the novels] as a TV series. There was so much from the book that we had to leave out of the Mortal Instruments film. In the series we'll be able to go deeper and explore this world in greater detail and depth." The producers hope to adapt the entire book series if the TV adaptation proves successful. In February 2015, book series author Cassandra Clare announced via Twitter that the television series would be called Shadowhunters rather than The Mortal Instruments. In March 2015, ABC Family picked up Shadowhunters straight-to-series. The series was renewed for a second season in March 2016, consisting of 20 episodes, which premiered on January 2, 2017. In April 2017, it was announced that the series was renewed for a third season of 20 episodes. The first half of ten episodes premiered on March 20, 2018. On June 4, 2018, Freeform canceled the series after three seasons, but ordered two extra episodes to properly conclude the series' story; the second half of the third season premiered on February 25, 2019.

In August 2016, soon before filming on the second season was to begin, showrunner Ed Decter exited the series over "creative differences". Todd Slavkin and Darren Swimmer, who were former showrunners on Smallville, were announced as Decter's replacements in August 2016.

Casting
On Twitter, Cassandra Clare announced that she would not be part of casting decisions, and would not be expecting any of the original film cast to return. On April 20, 2015, ABC revealed Dominic Sherwood as the first member of the Shadowhunters cast. On May 1, 2015, it was announced that Emeraude Toubia would be taking the role of Isabelle Lightwood and Alberto Rosende would be joining the cast as Simon Lewis. On May 6, it was reported that Katherine McNamara landed the lead role of Clary Fray. Two days later, on May 8, Matthew Daddario and Isaiah Mustafa were cast as Alec Lightwood and Luke Garroway, respectively. Harry Shum Jr. and Alan van Sprang later joined the cast on May 15, as Magnus Bane and Valentine Morgenstern. On May 18, it was announced that Maxim Roy would be playing Jocelyn Fray.

On May 28, Jon Cor was announced to play Hodge Starkweather, a Shadowhunter and former member of the Circle. David Castro was reported to be portraying vampire Raphael Santiago on June 4. Shortly after, on June 9, Lisa Marcos announced she would be joining the cast as Captain Vargas, a new character created for the series by Ed Decter. On June 12, producer McG's official Twitter account stated that Kaitlyn Leeb had been cast to play the vampire, Camille Belcourt. On June 16, Jade Hassouné was reported to be portraying the faerie, Meliorn. On August 8, Stephanie Bennett was cast as the new character Lydia Branwell, a rule-following Shadowhunter. On September 2, 2016, Alisha Wainwright was announced to play Maia Roberts in the second season, and soon promoted to series regular beginning in the third season.

Filming
The series began filming in Mississauga, Canada on May 25, 2015. The fictional New York Police Department's 89 Precinct was filmed in the Science Wing at the University of Toronto Scarborough.

Music

Soundtrack

Shadowhunters (Original Television Series Soundtrack) was released on platforms including iTunes, Spotify and Apple Music on July 21, 2017, featuring six original songs from the show.

Ben Decter composed the instrumental music score for the first season. Trevor Morris and Jack Wall composed the instrumental music score for the second and third seasons. Their music was released as a soundtrack album in 2018. The opening theme song is "This Is The Hunt" performed by Ruelle, which was written for Shadowhunters by Maggie Eckford (Ruelle's real name) and Jeff Bowman. Other Ruelle songs have featured in the series.

Broadcast
The series premiered on January 12, 2016, in the U.S. on Freeform. The second episode, "The Descent into Hell Is Easy", was released online that same day, following the premiere of the first episode. In December 2015, Netflix acquired global rights to Shadowhunters, excluding the U.S., making the series available as an original series a day after the U.S. premiere, with the first episode having launched globally on January 13, 2016, and subsequent episodes having been released on a weekly basis.

Reception

Ratings

Critical response

The debut season of Shadowhunters received mixed responses from critics. Metacritic gave it a 45 out of 100 rating, based on 9 reviews, indicating "mixed or average reviews". Rotten Tomatoes gave the series a 44% rating, based on 25 reviews, with an average rating of 5.81/10. The site's consensus states, "Shadowhunters boasts visual thrills and a potential-rich premise, but they're not enough to overcome the show's self-serious silliness and dull, convoluted plots."

According to James Poniewozik of The New York Times, the series "has its assets, especially its popular source material. But it might become more fun if it learns to enjoy being the empowerment fantasy it really is."

Accolades

Home media releases 
No subtitles are available on the Region 2 DVD and the United Kingdom Blu-ray. The Region 4 DVD has closed captions, excluding season 3 part B. None of them includes extra features.

References

External links
 
 

2010s American LGBT-related drama television series
2010s American teen drama television series
2010s American supernatural television series
2016 American television series debuts
2019 American television series endings
American fantasy drama television series
Angels in television
English-language television shows
Fictional portrayals of the New York City Police Department
Freeform (TV channel) original programming
Serial drama television series
Television about fairies and sprites
Television shows based on American novels
Television series about families
Television series about teenagers
Television series by Disney–ABC Domestic Television
Television series by Wonderland Sound and Vision
Television shows filmed in Toronto
Television shows set in New York City
The Mortal Instruments
Vampires in television
Television about werewolves
Wizards in television
Television series about parallel universes
LGBT speculative fiction television series
Television series reboots